The Elora Cash Spiel was an annual bonspiel on the men's and women's Ontario Curling Tour. It was held annually in November, at the Elora Curling Club in Elora, Ontario. The men's event was discontinued after 2012 and the women's after 2013.

Past Men's Champions

Past Women's Champions

References
 

Ontario Curling Tour events